Thomas of Frignano (1305–1381) was an Italian Franciscan theologian. He became Minister General of the Order of Friars Minor, and on 19 July 1372 was approved by Pope Gregory XI as patriarch of Grado.

Tommaso was created a cardinal on 20 September 1378 by Pope Urban VI. He was Bishop of Frascati and, as the senior bishop in Urban's new college, probably  Dean of the Sacred College of Cardinals from December 1378.  He died in Rome on 19 November 1381.

Notes

External links
Franaut page

1305 births
1381 deaths
Italian Friars Minor
14th-century Italian cardinals
Franciscan cardinals
Cardinal-bishops of Frascati
Deans of the College of Cardinals
Ministers General of the Order of Friars Minor